Anton Zarutskiy (born 27 April 1986) is a Russian rower. He competed in the men's coxless four event at the 2016 Summer Olympics.

References

External links
 

1986 births
Living people
Russian male rowers
Olympic rowers of Russia
Rowers at the 2016 Summer Olympics